Guusje van Mourik  (born 5 October 1955, Zeist, Netherlands)  she is a Dutch karateka, judoka and boxer. She has a 4th Dan black belt in karate, and is the winner of multiple World Karate Championships, and is in The Guinness Book of Records for winning the most karate medals. She was four times world champion, six times European champion and twenty five times national champion in this discipline in the class 60+ kilograms. Also, she was once Taiko ( Japanese ' drumming ' )  world champion and won several medals at the Dutch Judo National Championships. Guusje  first found success she achieved in 1974 by winning a silver medal in judo. In 1982 she became Dutch and world champion karate. In 1987, Gussje was given Order of Orange-Nassau. In 1989 she made her debut as a boxer. In 1992 she became head coach of the women's karate team. Since retiring from competitive karate Guus is now a dental technician.

Judo Medals

 1974  Dutch Championships Tilburg Bronze Medal
 1976  Dutch Championships Oss Silver Medal
 1978  Dutch Championships Groningen Silver Medal
 1979  Dutch Championships Haarlem Bronze Medal

Karate Medals

 1982  World Karate ChampionshipsGold Medal
 1983  European Karate Championships Kumite Gold Medal
 1984  World Karate Championships Kumite Gold Medal
 1985  European Karate Championships Kumite Gold Medal

References

External links

1955 births
Living people
Dutch female karateka
Dutch female judoka
Karate coaches
People from Zeist
Wadō-ryū practitioners
Sportspeople from Utrecht (province)
20th-century Dutch women
21st-century Dutch women